Giriraj Swami is an initiating guru in the International Society for Krishna Consciousness (ISKCON) and a disciple of A. C. Bhaktivedanta Swami Prabhupada, the founder-acharya of ISKCON.

Background
Giriraj Swami was born Glenn Phillip Teton, the only son of a Chicago lawyer who was later appointed judge. In March 1969, while studying at Brandeis University in Boston, he met A. C. Bhaktivedanta Swami Prabhupada, the founder-acharya of the International Society for Krishna Consciousness (ISKCON), from whom, he felt, he learned more in one brief exchange than he had learned in his many years of academic education. After graduating from Brandeis cum laude, he accepted formal initiation from Srila Prabhupada and received the spiritual name Giriraj das. Giriraj quickly became a leading member of the Boston center, and he was soon given the opportunity to go to India with Srila Prabhupada and helped establish Prabhupada's mission there.

In 1972, Giriraj was appointed by Prabhupada to be president of ISKCON Bombay and trustee of the Bhaktivedanta Book Trust.  Since then, he has made many significant contributions to Srila Prabhupada's mission, most notably overseeing all aspects of the development of Hare Krishna Land in Juhu, Bombay. He was instrumental in the acquisition and development of Bhaktivedanta Ashram in Govardhan and led the development of the Kirtan Ashram for women, the Bhaktivedanta Hospice, and the Vrindavan Institute of Palliative Care, all in Vrindavan. 

In the year following Srila Prabhupada's death in 1977, Giriraj was awarded sannyasa, the renounced order of life, and appointed president of ISKCON's board of trustees in India. In 1982 he was appointed to ISKCON's Governing Body Commission, and he went on to oversee the Society's activities in Bombay, Mauritius, South Africa, Spain, Portugal, Sri Lanka, and Pakistan.

Giriraj Swami has also taught at the Vrindavan Institute for Higher Education  and continues to lecture and give presentations at retreats and workshops around the world.

Presently based in Carpinteria, California, Giriraj Swami is now focusing on one of the main instructions he received from Srila Prabhupada—to write. He is the author of Watering the Seed, Many Moons: Reflections on Departed Vaishnavas, Life's Final Exam: Death and Dying from the Vedic Perspective, and his recent book about Srila Prabhupada's monumental efforts in Bombay, I'll Build You a Temple: The Juhu Story, published by the BBT. He is also working on books about his search for a spiritual master and his early days in the Boston temple, his travels with Srila Prabhupada in India, and Vaishnava holy days.

Books
 Watering the Seed, Giriraj Swami, Publisher: Mountain King (2000), ASIN: B000K9PRVS
 Watering the Seed - With Teachings from His Divine Grace A.C. Bhaktivedanta Swami Prabhupada (Revised and Expanded), Giriraj Swami, Publisher: Torchlight (2012), 
 Many Moons: Reflections on Departed Vaishnavas, Giriraj Swami, Publisher: Torchlight (2012), 
 Life's Final Exam: Death and Dying from the Vedic Perspective, edited by Giriraj Swami, Publisher: Torchlight (2013) 
I'll Build You a Temple: The Juhu Story, Publisher: Bhaktivedanta Book Trust (2020),

Notes

External links
Website of Giriraja Swami

Living people
Bhaktivedanta College
International Society for Krishna Consciousness religious figures
Converts to Hinduism
American Hare Krishnas
20th-century Hindu philosophers and theologians
Brandeis University alumni
1947 births